Kaylor is an unincorporated community in northern Cambria County, Pennsylvania, United States. It lies between Jamestown and Altoona, approximately 80 miles east of Pittsburgh.

Notable person

Kaylor is the birthplace of football player Joe Stydahar.

Unincorporated communities in Pennsylvania
Unincorporated communities in Cambria County, Pennsylvania